The Quaid-e-Azam Law College (QLC) is a Government law college located in Nawabshah, Sindh, Pakistan. It is the first Government sector law college in Shaheed Benazirabad (formally Nawabshah) region.

QLC is affiliated with University of the Sindh. The college offers LLB degree which is accredited by Pakistan Bar Council. QLC was established in 1998. The college was started classes in the Apwa girls public school Kacheri Road recently sindh government approved a new site for the college. In 2012 the college was shifted to its new location.

Location 
Opposite Farsi Bagh, Syed Colony, Sanghar Road, Nawabshah, Shaheed Benazirabad, Sindh 67450.

References

External links 
 QLC official website

Universities and colleges in Sindh
Memorials to Muhammad Ali Jinnah
Law schools in Pakistan